|}

The Grand Prix de Chantilly is a Group 2 flat horse race in France open to thoroughbreds aged four years or older. It is run at Chantilly over a distance of 2,400 metres (about 1½ miles), and it is scheduled to take place each year in late May or early June.

The event replaced the Grand Prix d'Évry, a race established when Évry Racecourse opened in 1973. It was run each year until the venue closed in 1996, and the present version was introduced at Chantilly in 1997.

The leading horses from the Grand Prix de Chantilly often go on to compete in the Grand Prix de Saint-Cloud. The last to win both in the same year was Waldgeist in 2018.

The Grand Prix de Chantilly is now staged on the same day as the Prix du Jockey Club.

Records
Most successful horse (2 wins):
 Policy Maker – 2004, 2006

Leading jockey (5 wins):
 Olivier Peslier – Fragrant Mix (1998), Doctor Dino (2008), Silver Pond (2011), In Swoop (2021), Mare Australis (2022)

Leading trainer (9 wins):
 André Fabre – Magwal (1984), Galla Placidia (1986), Star Lift (1989), Wajd (1991), Serrant (1993), Bright Moon (1994), Fragrant Mix (1998), Daring Miss (2000), Manatee (2015)

Leading owner (5 wins):
 Daniel Wildenstein – Star Lift (1989), Ode (1990), Pistolet Bleu (1992), Serrant (1993), Bright Moon (1994)

Winners since 1979

Earlier winners

 1973: Karoon
 1974: Admetus
 1975: Un Kopeck
 1976: Tip Moss
 1977: Paint the Town
 1978: Vagaries

See also
 List of French flat horse races

References
 France Galop / Racing Post:

 france-galop.com – A Brief History: Grand Prix de Chantilly.
 galop.courses-france.com – Grand Prix de Chantilly – Palmarès depuis 1997.
 galopp-sieger.de – Grand Prix de Chantilly.
 horseracingintfed.com – International Federation of Horseracing Authorities – Grand Prix de Chantilly (2016).
 pedigreequery.com – Grand Prix de Chantilly – Chantilly.

Open middle distance horse races
Chantilly Racecourse
Horse races in France